Burbiškis Manor is a former residential manor and park in Burbiškis, Anykščiai District Municipality, near the Anykšta river, built in 1853–1857. On March 4, 2015 the manor was opened after the reconstruction.

References

External links

Manor houses in Lithuania
Neoclassical architecture in Lithuania